Bruce Waid Clingan (born c. 1955) is a retired United States Navy admiral who last served as Commander of United States Naval Forces Europe, United States Naval Forces Africa and Allied Joint Force Command Naples from February 24, 2012 to July 22, 2014. He previously served as Deputy Chief of Naval Operations for Operations, Plans and Strategy and Commander, United States Sixth Fleet, as well as Commander, Joint Command Lisbon from August 2008 to November 2009. He retired from the Navy in the fall of 2014 after over 37 years of service.

Biography
Born in Lafayette, Indiana, he was raised in Bellevue, Washington. He is a graduate of the University of Washington and received a Master of Science degree from the University of Southern California. Being a member of the NROTC, he was commissioned to the U.S. Navy in June 1977.

Ashore, Clingan served as an F-14 flight instructor at Fighter Squadron 124, where he helped Naval Air Systems Command and Grumman Aerospace Corporation develop the F-14D Super Tomcat as a member of the Aircrew Systems Advisory Panel.

Clingan's first Joint assignment was in Europe, as a member of the Operations and Readiness Branch, Supreme Headquarters Allied Powers Europe, where he helped negotiate various North Atlantic Treaty Organization (NATO)/Spanish Coordination Agreements.

After selection to flag rank, Clingan joined United States Central Command, serving as deputy director of Operations from April 2002 to May 2004 during Operations Enduring Freedom and Iraqi Freedom. Clingan assumed command of Carrier Strike Group 3 / Carl Vinson Strike Group in June 2004 and served as CTF-50/152 during an extended deployment in support of Operation Iraqi Freedom in 2005.  Subsequently, he joined the staff of the chief of Naval Operations in September 2005 as deputy director, Air Warfare Division (N78B), followed by assignments as director, Air Warfare Division (N88) and director, Warfare Integration/Senior National Representative (N8F). Following his tour on chief of Naval Operations staff, he assumed command of Joint Command Lisbon; commander, U.S. 6th Fleet; commander, Allied Joint Command Lisbon; commander, Striking and Support Forces NATO; deputy commander, U.S. Naval Forces Europe; deputy commander, U.S. Naval Forces Africa; and Joint Forces Maritime Component Commander, Europe.

Clingan began his current (as of 2012) tour of duty in December 2009 as deputy chief of Naval Operations for Operations, Plans and Strategy (N3/N5). He assumed his current position February 24, 2012.

Awards and decorations

References
 www.navy.mil Official U.S.N. Biography of ADM Bruce W. Clingan

External links

 www.C6F.navy.mil Official U.S. Navy Biography about ADM Bruce W. Clingan

1950s births
Living people
United States Navy admirals
Recipients of the Meritorious Service Decoration
Recipients of the Legion of Merit
People from Lafayette, Indiana
University of Southern California alumni
United States Naval Aviators
Recipients of the Defense Superior Service Medal
Recipients of the Meritorious Service Medal (United States)